Loic Gautier (born 8 September 1954) is a French former cyclist. He competed in the team time trial event at the 1976 Summer Olympics.

References

External links
 

1954 births
Living people
French male cyclists
Olympic cyclists of France
Cyclists at the 1976 Summer Olympics
Sportspeople from Côtes-d'Armor
Cyclists from Brittany
21st-century French people
20th-century French people